Michelin Rally Masters: Race of Champions, also known as simply Rally Masters, is a racing video game developed by Digital Illusions CE and published by Infogrames in 2000 for Microsoft Windows and PlayStation. It is a rally racing game branded after the Race of Champions sporting event, and features 20 licensed rally automobiles.

A port of the game for the Nintendo 64 was in the works, to be released as Test Drive Rally on the North American market, but the publisher ultimately cancelled the project.

Reception

The PC version received favourable reviews, according to the review aggregation website GameRankings.

It won the award for "Racing Game of 2000" in Editors' Choice at IGNs Best of 2000 Awards.

See also
Rally Fusion: Race of Champions

References

External links

2000 video games
Cancelled Nintendo 64 games
Digital Illusions CE games
Infogrames games
PlayStation (console) games
Race of Champions
Rally racing video games
Multiplayer and single-player video games
Video games developed in Sweden
Video games scored by Olof Gustafsson
Windows games